Vania Wolfgramm (née Lavea, born 26 August 1981) is a New Zealand-born Samoan. A former member of the New Zealand women's national rugby union team, she is now a Women's Rugby Development Manager for New Zealand Rugby, the governing body of rugby union in the country, and a television commentator.

Early life

Wolfgramm was born in New Zealand. Her parents came from the villages of Safotu on Savai'i islands and Lauli'i on Upolo island in Samoa. She attended Onehunga High School in Onehunga, a suburb of Auckland. She made her international debut for New Zealand on 11 October 2003 against a World XV's team at Whangārei. She played for the Black Ferns and the Black Ferns sevens.

Career
Wolfgramm joined New Zealand Rugby in March 2012 as a Women's Rugby Development Officer for the Blues region. At that time, she was the sole employee working on women's rugby. By 2020, that had increased to seven. In 2020, she became Game Development Manager – Women's Rugby. She has played a leading role in developing the Pacific Aotearoa Cup tournament, which aims to expand opportunities for women of Samoan, Tongan, Cook Islands and Māori origin to play rugby. In 2019 she organized the New Zealand Women’s Rugby Invitational Tournament (NZWRIT) in Auckland, which attracted approximately 1100 participants of all age groups. She coaches the Auckland Samoa women's team.

Since she joined New Zealand Rugby there has been a big increase in the number of women and girls playing rugby. In part this is due to increased coverage on television. Wolfgramm is a commentator for Sky Sport. In 2019, she was one of 16 people worldwide chosen to take part in a global sports monitoring programme in the USA, organized by US Department of State and ESPN. She was mentored by Stacey Allaster, former chair and CEO of the Women's Tennis Association (WTA). In 2020 she initiated the first women-only Rugby Educator Programme, known as Ako Wāhine. This aims to build a confident and competent network of women to develop and deliver female-specific rugby developments and programmes.

Personal life
Wolfgramm is married with two children. She is the older sister of fellow Black Fern, Justine Lavea.

References

External links
Black Ferns Profile
Wolfgramm interviewed on Sky Sport

1981 births
Living people
New Zealand women's international rugby union players
New Zealand female rugby union players
New Zealand female rugby union administrators
Samoan women's rugby union coaches